Kavita Kapoor is an Indian film and television actress, most known for her role in television series Yes Boss (1999–2009). She is a part of shows like Just Mohabbat (1996–2000), Saans (1998–1999).

Career
Kavita played the role of doctor in Doordarshan serial Ajnabi (produced by Romesh Sharma) aired in 1994. She debuted with film Jeena Teri Gali Mein in 1991 as Khushboo. Her first television series is Kanoon (1993–1996) as Mili, she is a part of Just Mohabbat (1996–2000) as Maya and in Saans as Manisha (1998–1999). She is well known for her role Meera Srivastava in Yes Boss (1999–2009). She is part of show like Kittie Party (2000–2002) as Reva, and a film King of Bollywood (2004) as Mandira Kumar and Salaam Namaste as Doctor in 2005.
She is a part of shows like 
Pyaar Ka Bandhan (2009–2010) as 	Sonia Rai, Rakt Sambandh (2010–2011) as 	Prabha, Sumit Sambhal Lega 2015 as Avantika Seth (Maya's Mother).

Filmography

Television

References

External links

Living people
20th-century Indian actresses
Actresses in Hindi cinema
Indian television actresses
Indian stage actresses
Year of birth missing (living people)
21st-century Indian actresses
Place of birth missing (living people)